Iran Television School is a television program broadcast on IRIB Amoozesh that is broadcast to Iranian students following the COVID-19 pandemic. The schedule of this program is for Primary school, Middle school and High school.

This program covers all the lessons of each level and is broadcast every day and it is not possible to replay it.  However, any part of the program can be downloaded from the network social medias.

IRIB TV4 
Also, a program like this program called Iran School will be broadcast on IRIB TV4.

IRIB Quran 
Also, a similar program is broadcast on the IRIB Quran, with the difference that this program only deals with religious lessons of each level.

See also 
 COVID-19 pandemic in Iran

References

External links 
 Iran Television School on the official website of IRIB Amoozesh
 Iran School on the official website of IRIB TV4
 Iran Television School on the official website of IRIB Quran

Educational programs
Social programs
Iranian television shows